Campeonato Paulista Série B2, was the fifth level of the São Paulo state professional football championship, one of the Brazilian state championships.

List of champions 

 1978 - Cruzeiro (Cruzeiro)
 1979 - Bragantino (Bragança Paulista)
 1980 to 1993 - not held
 1994 - Orlândia (Orlândia)
 1995 - São Joaquim (São Joaquim da Barra)
 1996 - Valinhos (Valinhos)
 1997 - Oeste (Itápolis)
 1998 - Guapira (São Paulo)
 1999 - Flamengo (Guarulhos)
 2000 - ECO (Osasco)
 2001 - Primavera (Indaiatuba)
 2002 - ECUS (Suzano)
 2003 - Jalesense (Jales)
 2004 - Taboão da Serra (Taboão da Serra)

See also 
Campeonato Paulista
Campeonato Paulista Série A2
Campeonato Paulista Série A3
Campeonato Paulista Segunda Divisão
Campeonato Paulista Série B3
Federação Paulista de Futebol

External links 
 RSSSF (list of champions)
 RSSSF (list of participants)

Paulista Serie B2
5